Waheed Murad (2 October 1938 – 23 November 1983) was a Pakistani film actor, producer and script writer,  famous for his charming expressions, attractive personality, tender voice and unusual talent for acting. Waheed is considered as one of the most famous and influential actors of South Asia. He is often referred to as "Chocolaty Hero" or "Chocolate Hero". Born in Karachi, Sindh, Pakistan, did graduation from S.M. Arts College Karachi, and then masters in English literature from University of Karachi. He started his film career as cameo in 1959 in the film Saathi when he was 21 years old. His naughty facial gestures, bold romanticism and alluring performance style during picturisation of songs made him immensely popular.

One of his films is Armaan, which was produced by him, made a pivotal impact on the sub-continental film industry such that the Pakistani film industry was considered as the rising star and the film made him a superstar overnight. Once, in an interview in 1967, he said that Dilip Kumar, too, was not an immortal actor. Waheed was known as a cheque which could be cashed anywhere in the country and is the only actor of film industry to secure the highest number of platinum, diamond, golden and silver jubilees. He mesmerized Pakistani nation during 1960's & 1970's more than anyone before or after and is considered to be evergreen chocolate hero of Pakistan's silver screen history.

In November 2010, after a long period of 27 years after his death, the Pakistani President Asif Ali Zardari awarded him the Sitara-e-Imtiaz, the third highest honour and civilian award by the State of Pakistan, given in the fields of literature, arts, sports, medicine, or science.

Waheed acted in a total of 124 films as an actor and 6 films as a guest star. He had produced 11 films, directed 1 film and written 4 films.

As an actor 
Waheed Murad acted in a total of 124 films (2 films were released after his death) of which 38 were black and white and 86 were in colour. He acted in 115 Urdu films, 8 Punjabi films and 1 Pushto film. He also appeared as guest star in 6 films: 3 Urdu films & 3 Punjabi films. As an actor, Waheed achieved 4 Nigar Awards in the best actor's category for the films Heera Aur Pathar, Armaan, Andleeb and Mastana Mahi. A summary of his films released during the 1960s to 1980s (excluding the films, in which he appeared as a guest actor) is as follows:

A complete list of his Diamond, Platinum, Golden and Silver Jubilee and flopped films is as below:

Diamond Jubilee films

Platinum Jubilee films

Golden Jubilee films

Silver Jubilee films

Flopped films

As a cameo 
Waheed Murad appeared in 6 films (3 Urdu and 3 Punjabi) in cameo roles.

As a producer
Waheed Murad, as a producer, produced 11 films (10 Urdu films & 1 Punjabi film), of which 8 films were black & white and 3 films were colour. Most of these films, including Armaan, were appreciated by film critics. As producer he also achieved a Nigar award in the best producer's category for Armaan.

As a director 
Waheed Murad directed only one film Ishara, which failed to achieve the box office target.

As a writer 
Waheed Murad wrote the script for 4 films, two of them were much appreciated by cinemagoers.

As a singer
In the film Ishara, Waheed Murad got to sing the popular song Jaisay taisay beet gaya din...

References

External links
Waheed Murad filmography with Online Movies
Karachi cinemas' report on Waheed Murad films

Waheed Murad
Pakistani film-related lists
Pakistani filmographies
Murad, Waheed
Murad, Waheed